Decomiini is a tribe of plant bugs in the family Miridae. There are about six genera in Decomiini.

Genera
These six genera belong to the tribe Decomiini:
 Aurantiocoris Schuh & Schwartz, 2004 - Western Nearctic
 Decomia Poppius, 1915 - Paleotropical
 Decomioides Schuh, 1984 - Orient
 Malaysiamiris Schuh, 1984 - Orient
 Malaysiamiroides Schuh, 1984 - Orient
 Rubrocuneocoris Schuh, 1984 - Orient, Pacific Islands

References

Phylinae
Insect tribes